Gabriel Montcharmont (7 April 1940 – 15 January 2019) was a French politician.

References

1940 births
2019 deaths
Deputies of the 9th National Assembly of the French Fifth Republic
Deputies of the 11th National Assembly of the French Fifth Republic
Socialist Party (France) politicians
People from Autun
Mayors of places in Auvergne-Rhône-Alpes